Mike Boich was a major figure at Apple Computer who was in charge of demonstrating the first Macintosh to software developers and potential customers. He is notable as a technology evangelist who persuaded developers to write computer software. He was instrumental in hiring Apple entrepreneur Guy Kawasaki. His name is listed — as credited — inside the original Macintosh 128k.

References

Year of birth missing (living people)
Living people
Stanford University alumni
Harvard Business School alumni
Technology evangelists
Apple Inc. employees